Flinders Street Baptist Church is a church in Flinders Street, South Australia.

History

In response to a call by George Fife Angas for a Baptist minister to found a new church in Adelaide, Rev. Silas Mead emigrated aboard Parisian, arriving in July 1861. He began taking regular services at White's Rooms and soon his enthusiastic congregation decided to build a large church on Acre 273 in Flinders Street on the west corner of Divett Place.

Robert G. Thomas, the architect who would later be responsible for the Stow Memorial Church (now Pilgrim Uniting Church), was selected to design the building, which is of Gothic revival style in bluestone and sandstone with elaborate capitals on the columns, a rose window and front entrance with three arches supported by pillars.

The building, which cost £7,000 and took English & Brown two years to build, was opened on 19 May 1863. The debt was cleared the following year, Mead Hall was erected in 1867–1870 and the manse was built in 1877. 

The Australian Baptist Missionary Society was formed at the church under Rev Silas Mead in 1864, and the first missionary, Ellen Arnold, sent from there in 1882.

Heritage listing
On 28 May 1981, the church was listed on the South Australian Heritage Register.

The manse, in which Mead dwelt and his successors dwelt for many years, is now known as the Baptist Church Office, also known as Flinders House. Both the manse and Mead Hall were listed on 11 December 1997.

References

External links 
 Official website

Baptist churches in Australia
Churches in Adelaide
Churches completed in 1863
1863 establishments in Australia
Gothic Revival architecture in Adelaide
South Australian Heritage Register